Chloroclystis invisibilis is a moth in the  family Geometridae. It is found on Sulawesi.

References

Moths described in 1907
Chloroclystis
Moths of Indonesia